Donald C. Peters is the current president of the Dominica State College and has been incumbent since 2010.

References 

Dominica educators
Living people
Year of birth missing (living people)